The 1921 Brown Bears football team represented Brown University as an independent during the 1921 college football season. Led by 20th-year head coach Edward N. Robinson, the Bears compiled a record of 5–3–1.

Schedule

References

Brown
Brown Bears football seasons
Brown Bears football